Democratic Youth Federation of India (DYFI) is a youth organisation in India. It was founded in its inaugural conference held from 1–3 November 1980 at Shaheed Kartar Singh Saraba village in Ludhiana, Punjab.

DYFI identifies itself to be an independent organisation. Former West Bengal chief minister Buddhadeb Bhattacharjee who was a former secretary of Bengal fraction, and a founder Central Committee member of DYFI, Manik Sarkar – the former chief minister of Tripura – was a vice president of the organisation, and M. Vijayakumar who was the speaker of Kerala legislative assembly was once former all-India president of DYFI. In 2021, M.B. Rajesh, a former all-India president of DYFI was elected as the Speaker of Kerala legislative assembly.

As of 2012, DYFI had a membership of 2.2 million which rose from 1.4 million in 2011. The annual membership fee of DYFI is a meager Rs. 2 and is open to all youth between the age 15 and 40 irrespective of their political ideology.

Affiliations

DYFI is a member of World Federation of Democratic Youth.wfdy

The DYFI affiliate in Jammu and Kashmir is called Jammu & Kashmir Democratic Youth Federation. In Tripura there is a separate body, affiliated to DYFI, called Tribal Youth Federation.

History
The organisation was formed on 3 November 1980 from its inaugural conference held at Saheed Kartar Singh Saraba Village, Ludhiana, Punjab from 31 October to 3 November.

On 25 November 1994, five members of DYFI were killed after being shot by state police force during a protest against the commercialisation of higher education at Kuthuparamba in Kannur district, Kerala, while one was paralysed.

Publications
At the national level, DYFI publishes the magazine Naujawan Drishti (Youth Stream). On the state level there are various publications, such as Jubashakti in West Bengal, Yuvadhara in Kerala, and Yuvasangharsh in Maharashtra.'Izhaingar Muzhakkam' in Tamil Nadu.

See also
 Students' Federation of India
 All India Youth Federation

References

External links
 

1980 establishments in India
Organizations established in 1980
Volunteer organisations in India